Toby Henry Francis Jessel (11 July 1934 – 3 December 2018) was a British Conservative Party politician, who was the Member of Parliament for Twickenham from 1970 to 1997.

Early life
Jessel was born at Bearsted in Kent on 11 July 1934, the son of Winifred Levy (1905–1977) and Commander Richard Frederick Jessel, D.S.O. (1902–1988), a Royal Navy officer. He was the great-grandson of Marcus Samuel, 1st Viscount Bearsted, and his great-great uncle was the judge George Jessel. His sister Camilla married the Polish-born composer Andrzej Panufnik.

He received his formal education at the Royal Naval College, Dartmouth, and at Balliol College, Oxford.

Political career
Jessel joined the Conservative Party, and served as a councillor in the London Borough of Southwark from 1964. The same year, he contested Peckham in the general election and then in 1966 twice fought Kingston upon Hull North, first in a by-election and then at the general election which followed. He represented Richmond-upon-Thames on the Greater London Council between 1967 and 1973.

He was elected as the Member of Parliament for Twickenham at the 1970 general election (the seat having been vacant since the death of Gresham Cooke on 22 February 1970), and held it for almost 30 years until being defeated in the 1997 general election by Vince Cable of the  Liberal Democrats.

Personal life
Jessel married Philippa Jephcott in 1967; they were divorced in 1973. Their only child, Sarah, was killed in a car accident in 1976 at the age of five. He married his second wife, Eira Heath, in 1980. Jessel's elder brother, Oliver, died on 21 June 2017.

Jesel resided at The Old Court House in Hampton Court, Middlesex, for almost fifty years, until selling it in 2013. He died on 3 December 2018, at the age of 84. He was a member of the Garrick Club and famously stood up in the House of Commons with his club tie sticking out of his trouser fly.

References

Bibliography
Times Guide to the House of Commons, Times Newspapers Limited, 1997

External links 
 

1934 births
2018 deaths
Alumni of Balliol College, Oxford
Conservative Party (UK) councillors
Conservative Party (UK) MPs for English constituencies
Councillors in the London Borough of Southwark
English Jews
Jewish British politicians
Members of the Greater London Council
Presidents of the Oxford University Conservative Association
UK MPs 1970–1974
UK MPs 1974
UK MPs 1974–1979
UK MPs 1979–1983
UK MPs 1983–1987
UK MPs 1987–1992
UK MPs 1992–1997
People from Bearsted
British Eurosceptics